Kleyner Bejarano Mena (born 16 September 1989) is a Colombian footballer who plays for Orange County FC.

Career
Bejarano began his career with Expreso Rojo, before having stints with Barranquilla, Cortuluá and Fortaleza in his native Colombia.

In 2014, Bejarano moved to the United States, where he signed with USL PDL club Los Angeles Misioneros. After a season with the club, he moved to USL club Colorado Springs Switchbacks, signing with the club on February 13, 2015.

References

External links

Switchbacks FC bio

1989 births
Living people
Colombian footballers
Colombian expatriate footballers
Barranquilla F.C. footballers
Tigres F.C. footballers
Cortuluá footballers
Fortaleza C.E.I.F. footballers
LA Laguna FC players
Colorado Springs Switchbacks FC players
Association football defenders
Expatriate soccer players in the United States
USL League Two players
USL Championship players
National Premier Soccer League players
Sportspeople from Chocó Department